Lalas can refer to:

People
Alexi Lalas (born 1970), American association football defender 
Sita Ram Lalas (1912–1986), Indian linguist and lexicographer 
Steven John Lalas (born 1953), American State Department communications officer
Vytautas Lalas (born 1982), Lithuanian strongman competitor

Settlements
Lalas, Elis, village in Greece, notable for the Battle of Lalas

See also
Shanghai Lalas, a 2012 book by Lucetta Kam Yip-lo
Lala (surname)
Lala (disambiguation)